The Academy of Western Artists, based in Gene Autry, Oklahoma, is an organization that honors individuals who have preserved and perpetuated the heritage of the American cowboy, through rodeo, music, poetry, campfire and chuckwagon cooking, and western and ranch clothing and gear.
 
The academy seeks to preserve the traditional values associated with the cowboy image despite consolidation in the cattle industry and changes in contemporary society. The group hosts an annual awards show. Its director is the western publisher Bobby Newton.
 
In 1996, the academy began making annual awards at a gathering in Fort Worth, Texas, specifically to recognize the performers and artisans active in the contemporary cowboy and western movement. The awards have been received by more than 500 individuals in a variety of categories. R.W. Hampton received the first Will Rogers Awards, named for the cowboy humorist Will Rogers. He was both "Male Vocalist of the Year" and "Entertainer of the Year" in 1996. A year later, Hampton's album, Ridin' The Dreamland Range, was honored as the association's Album of the Year. Hampton won "Male Vocalist of the Year" again in 1999, 2002, and 2006.

The 2011 winner, honored early in 2012 at the 16th annual awards presentation, include Bruce Pollock (radio disc jockey), Henry Real Bird and Bette Wolf Duncan (poetry books, Horse Tracks and Dakota, respectively), The Nugents (young artists), Syd Masters (male singer), and Mary Kaye (female singer), Jimmy Burson and Joni Harms (Western swing), Stardust Cowboys (Western album "Riding Back to You"), Curtis Potter (Country album, "The Potter's Touch"), and B. K. Nuzum (chuckwagon).
 
Since 2008, the academy has presented the Will Rogers Medallion Award. This award recognizes outstanding western literature, including books of poetry, fiction, non-fiction, cookbooks, and works for younger readers. One of the 2012 winners is Will Rogers - a Political Life by Richard D. White of Baton Rouge, Louisiana, published by the Texas Tech University Press in Lubbock, Texas.

On March 29, 2014, the academy presented its first annual fiction and non-fiction Western book awards named in honor of the late novelist Elmer Kelton of San Angelo, Texas. 
 
Similar in scope to the Academy of Western Artists is the Western Music Association, incorporated in Arizona in 1989, which maintains its own Hall of Fame.

References
 

Awards established in 1996
American music awards
Music industry associations
Culture of the Western United States
Cowboy culture
Historical preservationists
Music organizations based in the United States
501(c)(3) organizations
Non-profit organizations based in Oklahoma